Gdańsk Olszynka is a former railway station in Gdańsk, Poland.

Lines crossing the station

Olszynka